"Saint-Tropez" is a song by American rapper and singer Post Malone from his third studio album, Hollywood's Bleeding (2019). Its name is taken from the French town of Saint-Tropez. It was written by Post Malone, Frank Dukes, Jahaan Sweet, Billy Walsh, Nima Jahanbin, Paimon Jahanbin, and Louis Bell, with production handled by Frank Dukes, Jahaan Sweet, and Wallis Lane.

The song peaked at number 18 on the US Billboard Hot 100 songs chart. The title refers to the French beach town Saint-Tropez, where the protagonist in the song claims to be.

Critical reception
Will Schube from Billboard ranked the track, 16th, out of the 17 songs on the album, in terms of the best records on the project, complimenting Malone's vocals but criticizing the weakness and genericism of the track's lyrics.

Lyrics
Mikael Wood from the Los Angeles Times described the song's lyrics as being about Post Malone's material comforts and the lack of fulfilling feelings like joy that he's unable to have with them.

Music video
The music video for the song was released on September 11, 2019. It was filmed in the mountains of Cottonwood Heights, Utah and the town of Saint-Tropez in the French Riviera and was directed by Chris Villa. Various luxury vehicles such as the Bugatti, McLaren and Rolls-Royce are featured in the clip.

Personnel
Credits adapted from Tidal.

 Post Malone – principal vocalist, songwriting
 Louis Bell – recording, songwriting, vocal production
 Frank Dukes – production, songwriting, programming
 Jahaan Sweet – production, songwriting, programming
 Wallis Lane – production, songwriting, programming
 Billy Walsh – songwriting
 Manny Marroquin – mixing
 Chris Galland – mixing assistance
 Robin Florent – mixing assistance
 Scott Desmarais – mixing assistance
 Jeremie Inhaber – mixing assistance

Charts

Certifications

Release history

References

External links

Songs about depression
Songs about cities
Songs about France
Saint-Tropez in fiction
2019 songs
Post Malone songs
Songs written by Louis Bell
Songs written by Post Malone
Song recordings produced by Frank Dukes